Megah Murni FC (official name Megah Murni Football Club) is a Malaysian football club based in Serdang, Selangor. They most recently played in the third-tier division in Malaysian football, the Malaysia FAM League in 2015.

Honours

Kit manufacturer and shirt sponsor

Players

Current squad

2016 Transfers
For recent transfers, see List of Malaysian football transfers 2017 and List of Malaysian football transfers summer 2016

Transfers

In

Out

Club officials

 President         :  Gunabalan a/l Gunaratnam
 Manager           :  Tamilselvan a/l Sankupillai
 Head Coach        :  R. Nallathamby
 Assistant Coach   :  Saravanan a/l Subramaniam
 Goalkeeping Coach : 
 Fitness Coach     :  
 Physio            :  Prem Ghanesh Chandra Segeran
 Kitman            :  
 Security Officer  :  Rajasegaran a/l S. Karupiah
 Media Officer     :  Hema a/p Pachapan

Coaches

References

External links
 Soccerway Page

Malaysia FAM League clubs
Football clubs in Malaysia